The municipality of Moxa forms part of the Saale-Orla district in Thuringia, Germany.

References

Saale-Orla-Kreis